Calford Green is a small hamlet situated 0.5 miles south of Kedington and two miles east of Haverhill in south-west Suffolk, United Kingdom.

External links

Villages in Suffolk